On My Own is a 1991 film starring Judy Davis and Matthew Ferguson. Ferguson plays Simon Henderson, a student at an Ontario boarding school, whose father lives in Hong Kong, and whose mother (played by Davis) is from England. The plot revolves around Simon coming to terms with the revelation that his mother suffers from schizophrenia.

Production
Some of the film's location shooting was done in London, England (not London, Ontario), St. Catharines, Ontario, Toronto and Stratford, Ontario. The film is primarily set at an "Ontario boarding school" and the scenes showing the school were filmed at two real-life boarding schools in Ontario, Ridley College (with its distinctive bell tower and entrance gates, called the Marriott Gates) and Upper Canada College (including the interior of the Upper School and the interior of Wedd's boarding house).

Post-production for the film was done in Australia by the South Australian Film Corporation.

References

External links

On My Own at Oz Movies

1991 films
Australian drama films
Canadian drama films
English-language Canadian films
1991 drama films
Films set in Ontario
Films directed by Antonio Tibaldi
1990s English-language films
1990s Canadian films
1990s Australian films